{{DISPLAYTITLE:C9H10O4}}
The molecular formula C9H10O4 (molar mass : 182.17 g/mol, exact mass : 182.05790878 u) may refer to:

 3,5-Dihydroxyphenylpropionoic acid, a metabolite of alkylresorcinols
 Dihydrocaffeic acid, a phenolic compound
 Ethyl protocatechuate, a phenolic compound
 Flopropione
 Homovanillic acid
 m-Hydroxyphenylhydracrylic acid
 Methylenomycin A
 Syringaldehyde